Extrication morality is a moral theory proposed by C.A.J. Coady which attempts to accommodate seemingly immoral actions, particularly of politicians, as a legitimate form of necessary evil.

See also
Dirty hands
Ticking time bomb scenario

Further reading

Consequentialism